Yi Yin (born Yī Zhì (伊挚), also known as A Heng (阿衡)), was a Chinese politician who served as a minister of the early Shang dynasty, and one of the honoured officials of the era. He helped Tang of Shang, the founder of the Shang dynasty, to defeat King Jie of Xia. Oracle inscriptions of Yi have been found, evidence that his social status was high.

Biography

Origin
According to legend, Yi was a slave of a man named Youshen. When Youshen's daughter married Tang of Shang, he became Tang's slave. He was gifted in cooking, so Tang made him his chef. While he served Tang his meals, he used this opportunity to analyse the current issues of the time, such as the bad points of Jie of Xia.  He also proposed his plan to overthrow Jie of Xia. He earned Tang's trust, became Tang's right-hand man and was made 'Yin(尹)'.

However, other versions of his life exist. In another story, Yi had never been a slave. Tang had heard of him, and Tang tried five times to recruit him before Yi accepted his request for help.

Tang of Shang
Tang moved to a place where the Xia capital was easily accessible. They stopped paying Jie taxes. Jie was furious, and summoned the armies of his nine tribes to fight Tang. Then Yi assured Tang to wait for Jie of Xia's armies to drop in power. He explained to Tang that the noblemen who served Jie still had strong armies. So, they waited for a year until they launched an attack into the noblemen's states, and won every battle.

When they were only five li from the capital, however, Yi called for a stop. He explained that the army needed a boost in morale, and so Tang gave a speech to the soldiers, which came to be known as 'Tang's pledge' (湯誥, now in Shangshu). Afterwards, they defeated Jie of Xia in the decisive Battle of Mingtiao.

During the early Shang dynasty, Yi helped Tang set up different institutions, resulting in stability in politics as well as economic benefits.

Subsequent rulers and death

After Tang died, two of his sons succeeded the throne, but they both died early. Therefore, Yi Yin ruled as a regent under Tang's grandson, Taijia of Shang.
What follows is uncertain. According to a popular theory, Yi wrote three essays to Taijia regarding his rule (伊訓 chapter of the Shangshu). After reading the essays, Taijia managed to adhere by them for the first two years, but failed to do so from the third. He started to rule as he pleased, and no longer followed any of the laws that the ancients had followed. He treated his subjects cruelly. He did not listen to Yi's advice. Yi, seeing that Taijia would not give in, banished the king to Tonggong(桐宮,archaic name for the tomb of Tang) and became the temporary ruler of China. Alternately (太甲 chapters in the Shangshu), Yi approached Taijia with a number of oral admonitions which were not heeded to, causing Taijia's exile. The measure was successful, the king transformed.

After three years, Taijia was released and Yi, along with some officials, returned Taijia to the capital and returned Taijia's power. He started to use less oppressive laws and ruled the kingdom properly. After Taijia's death, the next king, Woding of Shang, took over. On Woding's eight year as king, Yi died. According to some legends, he was one hundred years old. Woding arranged a funeral for Yi Yin that was made for the king. He sacrificed cattle, sheep and swine, and mourned for three years.

Although this story is recorded in Records of the Grand Historian, Mencius, and Zuo Zhuan, the Bamboo Annals records otherwise. According to this version, Yi and Taijia were in fact fighting for power. Yi had banished Taijia to his grandfather's tomb, then seized absolute power for seven years. Taijia escaped, murdered Yi and returned the throne. However, archaeological evidence based on contemporary records in oracle bone script showed that Yi was still worshipped by the Shang people, including the royal family, several hundred years after his death, putting a big question mark over the reliability of the latter account.

Recent epigraphic evidence
《尹诰》 Yingao (excavated text of the Tsinghua Bamboo Slips cash) contains a total of 112 characters.
《伊尹·九主》 Jiu zhu (excavated at Mawangdui)

References 

Chinese centenarians
Chinese chancellors
Chinese chefs
Men centenarians
Regents of China
Politicians from Luoyang
Shang dynasty politicians